Nataliia Butkova (born 14 July 1991) is a Russian Paralympic swimmer. She represented Russian Paralympic Committee athletes at the 2020 Summer Paralympics.

Career
Butkova represented Russian Paralympic Committee athletes at the 2020 Summer Paralympics in the women's 150 metre individual medley SM4 event and won a bronze medal.

References

1991 births
Living people
Sportspeople from Volgograd
Russian female medley swimmers
Paralympic swimmers of Russia
Medalists at the World Para Swimming Championships
Medalists at the World Para Swimming European Championships
Swimmers at the 2020 Summer Paralympics
Medalists at the 2020 Summer Paralympics
Paralympic medalists in swimming
Paralympic silver medalists for the Russian Paralympic Committee athletes
Paralympic bronze medalists for the Russian Paralympic Committee athletes
Russian female freestyle swimmers
S4-classified Paralympic swimmers
20th-century Russian women
21st-century Russian women